Mirnawan Nawawi (born 19 September 1971) is a former field hockey player from Malacca, Malaysia. He went to the Royal Military College, Kuala Lumpur during his high school years. Mirnawan was the skipper for the Malaysia national team from 1998 until 2002. He was known as 'The Boss' during his playing days and has scored 250 career goals.

Career

Domestic
In Malaysia Hockey League, Mirnawan has won four doubles with four teams Tenaga Nasional Berhad HC (then called Kelab Kilat) in 1991–92, Yayasan Negeri Sembilan HC in 1996, MPPJ in 1997 and BSN in 2000. In 2001 he won the MHL Cup and emerged as the top scorer with 19 goals but lose the league title to Tenaga Nasional Berhad.

In 2002, he represent the Arthur Andersen Sports Club. In 2004, he clinch the league title with Sapura. He last played in the Malaysian Hockey League for Telekom Malaysia in 2005. He return to the competitive game when playing for Kepong Baru in the Kuala Lumpur Hockey League.

National team
In 1988, 17-year-old Mirnawan was part of a Junior World Cup bound team that played in the MHL.

Mirnawan has played in three Olympics Barcelona 1992, Atlanta 1996 and Sydney 2000, three Asian Games Beijing 1990, Hiroshima 1994 and Bangkok 1998, the Champions Trophy and two World Cup in Utrecht 1998 and Kuala Lumpur 2012.

In his last Olympic appearances, Mirnawan has been selected as the Flag Bearer of the Malaysian Contingent for the Opening Ceremony of the Sydney 2000 Olympic Games. He stepped down from the international scene in 2002 after having acquired 327 caps.

He is the manager for Project 2013 squad that finish as champions in 2012 Junior Asia Cup.

References

External links

TRANSKRIP TEMUBUAL BERSAMA DENGAN ENCIK MIRNAWAN BIN NAWAWI MENGENAI PENGLIBATAN, PENGALAMAN DAN SUMBANGAN BELIAU DALAM ARENA SUKAN HOKI NEGARA 

1971 births
Living people
Malaysian people of Malay descent
People from Malacca
Malaysian male field hockey players
Male field hockey forwards
Olympic field hockey players of Malaysia
Field hockey players at the 1992 Summer Olympics
Field hockey players at the 1996 Summer Olympics
Field hockey players at the 2000 Summer Olympics
1998 Men's Hockey World Cup players
2002 Men's Hockey World Cup players
Commonwealth Games silver medallists for Malaysia
Asian Games medalists in field hockey
Asian Games bronze medalists for Malaysia
Commonwealth Games medallists in field hockey
Medalists at the 1990 Asian Games
Southeast Asian Games medalists in field hockey
Southeast Asian Games gold medalists for Malaysia
Field hockey players at the 1990 Asian Games
Field hockey players at the 1998 Commonwealth Games
Competitors at the 1995 Southeast Asian Games
Competitors at the 1997 Southeast Asian Games
Competitors at the 1999 Southeast Asian Games
Competitors at the 2001 Southeast Asian Games
Medallists at the 1998 Commonwealth Games